Amon Olive Assemon (born 12 November 1987)  is an Ivorian international team handball player.

Career
Assemon has played for the Ivorian national team. She participated at the 2011 World Women's Handball Championship in Brazil, were Ivory Coast advanced from the group stage, but was eliminated by eventual world champion Brazil in the knockout stage.

Assemon played for the Ivorian national team at the 2015 African Games, where she scored two goals in the group match against DR Congo.

References

1987 births
Living people
Ivorian female handball players
Competitors at the 2015 African Games
African Games competitors for Ivory Coast